The National Police Cadet of Royal Malaysian Police is a uniformed body at selected high schools in Malaysia with the aim of inculcating discipline among students and helping to curb negative activities. They are available for those who are 14 years old and up to 21 years old.

The purpose of establishing the Police Cadet is to give exposure to a number of students in aspects of the role and function of policing in dealing with the problem of moral crime, drugs, and gangsterism among students who will become leaders in the future.

History
The idea to form a Police Cadet corps was triggered by the former Inspector-General of Police, late Tun Mohamed Salleh Ismail when opening Launching Police Cadet Team on 2 March 1970. He said,

Organisation 
Police Cadet platoon (one platoon per school) members are trainee cadets, senior cadets, Cadet Corporal and a Cadet Sergeant. Cadet team members and trainee Cadets are picked from high school students who had passed basic interviews and physical tests. Senior Cadets are made up of those who have passed interviews at PDRM (Royal Malaysian Police HQ) and one teacher in their respective high school would be selected to become a Cadet Inspector, tasked with being the platoon advisor. A Police Cadet platoon is normally made up of 35 members including three corporals, a sergeant and a senior cadet officer leading a team of 30 senior cadets and cadets.

Purposes of establishing
 Role Of Youth In "Nation Building"
 As Co-curricular activity

Training and membership
Open to students in high schools where Police Cadet platoons have been formed
Membership is open only to those who are healthy and capable of weekend marches and running exercises.
Selected members would be supplied with a specialised Police Cadet uniform that complies with a specific design.
Police Cadet members are usually allowed (e.g. Sekolah Aminuddin Baki, KL) to wear their PDRM name tags, black leather shoes and PDRM web belts as part of their school uniforms.

Among other topics, basic Police Cadet training includes:
Marching -- Marching activities with an annual marching competition at state level.
Lectures -History, - Law, Police roles and responsibility, Police structure, First Aid, Firearms
Camping—Annual camping supported by elements of PDRM's Polis Hutan or GOF. Platoon-sized tents are provided, with rations
Shooting—Annual shooting competition at PULAPOL. Commonly used firearms include the Colt M16, Smith & Wesson .38 Special, Browning Hi-Power, Walther PPK, Heckler & Koch MP5 and others.
Service—Carrying out pure soul movements, community watch and projects.

References

Royal Malaysia Police